Erasmus Smith's Professor of Natural and Experimental Philosophy at Trinity College Dublin is a chair in physics founded in 1724 and funded by the Erasmus Smith Trust, which was established by Erasmus Smith, a wealthy London merchant, who lived from 1611–1691. It is one of the oldest dedicated chairs of physics in Britain and Ireland. Originally, the holder was to be elected from the members of the college by an examination to determine the person best qualified for the professorship. Since 1851, the professorship has been supported by Trinity College. Of the 22 holders of this chair, seven were Fellows of the Royal Society while one, Ernest Walton, won the Nobel Prize for Physics.

The inaugural Erasmus Smith's Professor of Natural and Experimental Philosophy was Richard Helsham (1724), who was also the Donegal Lecturer in Mathematics (1723-30) as well as the Regius Professor of Physic (1733-38) at Trinity College. He is best known for his book, A Course of Lectures in Natural Philosophy, which was published posthumously in 1739. This publication is considered to be one of the earliest undergraduate textbooks on Newtonian Physics and was required reading for undergraduates as late as 1849.

From 1724 to 1847 the chair had a mostly, but not exclusively, mathematical and theoretical orientation, with many holders being also mathematicians, and several such as Bartholomew Lloyd (1822) and James MacCullagh (1843) having previously held the Erasmus Smith's Professor of Mathematics chair. However, this period also saw the appointment of Humphrey Lloyd (1831), who succeeded his father Bartholomew Lloyd, and is considered one of Trinity’s greatest experimental physicists. The younger Lloyd is known for experimentally verifying conical refraction, a theoretical prediction made by William Rowan Hamilton about the way light is bent when traveling through a biaxial crystal. He also performed important research on terrestrial magnetism, visiting Gauss and Alexander von Humboldt in Germany, as well as building a “magnetical observatory” in Trinity College Dublin. In 1847 the University Chair of Natural Philosophy (1847) was founded and took on the applied mathematics and theoretical physics role, while Erasmus Smith's Professorship became predominantly a chair of experimental physics.

Since then, the chair has been occupied by a number of noted experimental physicists. For example, George Francis FitzGerald (1881) is known for his work in electromagnetic theory and for the Lorentz–FitzGerald contraction, which became an integral part of Albert Einstein's special theory of relativity. Ernest Walton (1946) is the only Irish scientist to win the Nobel Prize for Physics. He is best known for his work with John Cockcroft to construct one of the earliest types of particle accelerator, complete with its Cockcroft-Walton voltage-multiplying circuit, devised by themselves and subsequently reproduced widely in high-voltage generators elsewhere. In experiments performed at Cambridge University in the early 1930s using the generator, Walton and Cockcroft became the first team to use a particle beam to transform one element to another.

More recently, Brian Henderson (1974) greatly expanded  research in condensed matter and magnetic resonance.  Denis Weaire (1984), a theoretical physicist, proposed a counter-example to Lord Kelvin's conjecture on which surface was the most economical way to divide space into cells of equal size with the least surface area. This counter-example is now referred to as the Weaire–Phelan structure. Mike Coey (2007) is a renowned experimentalist in the area of magnetism, who classified magnetic order in amorphous solids, discovered the interstitial rare earth magnet Sm2Fe17N3, developed ferrimagnetic spin electronics and investigated the effects of magnetic fields on water. The current incumbent, Jonathan Coleman (2022), is well-known in the field of nanomaterials for his development of liquid phase exfoliation, a versatile method for making 2D materials in large quantities. 

A number of prominent Erasmus Smith’s Professors have been the subject of Trinity Monday Memorial Discourses, public talks which are accompanied by short published biographies, usually written by prominent Trinity College academics. In addition, the history of the Erasmus Smith Professorship is described in Eric Finch’s excellent book, “Three Centuries of Physics in Trinity College Dublin”.

List of the professors

 1724–1738: Richard Helsham (1683–1738)
 1738–1743: Caleb Cartwright (1696?–1763)
 1743–1745: (vacant) 
 1745–1759: William Clement (1707-1782)
 1759–1769: Hugh Hamilton (1729–1805)
 1769–1786: Thomas Wilson (1726–1799)
 1786–1799: Matthew Young (1750–1800)
 1799–1807: Thomas Elrington (1760–1835)   
 1807–1822: William Davenport (1772-1823)
 1822–1831: Bartholomew Lloyd (1772–1837)
 1831–1843: Humphrey Lloyd (1800–1881)
 1843–1848: James MacCullagh (1809–1847)
 1848–1854: Robert Dixon (1812–1885)
 1854–1870: Joseph Galbraith (1818-1890) 
 1870–1881: John Leslie (1830-1881)
 1881-1901: George FitzGerald (1851-1901) 
 1901–1929: William Thrift (1870–1942) 
 1929–1946: Robert Ditchburn (1903–1987)
 1946–1974: Ernest Walton (1903–1995) 
 1974–1984: Brian Henderson (1936–2017)
 1984–2007: Denis Weaire (born 1942)
 2007–2012: Michael Coey (born 1945)
 2012–2022: (vacant)
 2022–present: Jonathan Coleman (born 1973)

See also
 List of professorships at the University of Dublin
 Natural philosophy

References

1724 establishments in Ireland
Natural and Experimental Philosophy, Smith's, Erasmus
Natural and Experimental Philosophy, Smith's, Erasmus, Dublin}±